George Tor (born July 7, 1989) is a Nigerian footballer.

Career

College
Tor played college soccer at Medaille College between 2009 and 2012.

During his time at college, Tor also played for Reading United and Central Florida Kraze in the USL PDL.

Professional
He signed his first professional contract on May 30, 2013 with USL Pro club Rochester Rhinos In addition, on February 13, 2013, he made his professional soccer debut for the Tampa Bay Rowdies as they took on the Montreal Impact of the MLS in Orlando, Florida.

References

External links
USL bio

1989 births
Living people
Nigerian footballers
Nigerian expatriate footballers
Reading United A.C. players
Orlando City U-23 players
Rochester New York FC players
Association football forwards
Expatriate soccer players in the United States
USL League Two players
USL Championship players